Brussels attack may refer to:

The 1979 Brussels bombing
The 2016 Brussels bombings
The 2016 stabbing of Brussels police officers
The June 2017 Brussels attack
The August 2017 Brussels attack
The 2018 Brussels stabbing attack